Isaac Akuaba Kuma Akuffo (born 21 February 1992), who goes by the stage name Koo Ntakra, is a hiplife and hip hop artist from Ghana who raps in his native language of Akuapem. He was signed to Bullhaus Entertainent in 2014. He won MTN Hitmaker in 2013 and was also nominated at Unsung Category in the Ghana Music Awards. He also won Rap Act of the year and Artist of the Year at Eastern Music Awards 2017. He was featured on Sarkodie's Trumpet collaboration in 2017.

Music career 
Koo Ntakra was a contestant in the season 2 of the reality competition show MTN Hitmaker in Ghana in 2013, where he emerged as the overall winner.  He was signed shortly afterwards to Bullhaus Entertainment and has gone on to release several singles. He released "Wurewurafuo" which he featured Pope Skinny which gained him more attention in Ghana in 2015. He released his first album - Akuaba Album in 2014 and the second studio album King of Kofcity was released in 2017. He has performed at Legends & Legacy ball, BBnZ Afrobeat Big Weekend, Ghana Meets Naija, Saminifest and others.

Discography

Singles 

 Wurewurafo
 Kondem
 Rap Lesson
 Oman Ghana
 Ohemaa ft Eno Barony
 Kill Me Shy ft Gachios
 Twa Di ft Mr Bergs
 Girls ft Yaa Pono
 Yeeba
 Gbelemi
 Bam
 Berma
 KofCity Boys
Dream

Albums 

 Akuaba - 2014
 King of Kofcity (KOK) - 2017

Awards and nominations

References

Ghanaian highlife musicians
Ghanaian hip hop musicians
1992 births
Living people